José Rezende Filho (1929–1977) is a Brazilian writer.

José Rezende Filho was born in Recife, in 1929. He spent most of his childhood in Carpina, in Pernambuco state, where he completed his elementary education.

He started his literary activity quite early in his life, founding a short-lived magazine, A Capital in Recife, when he was 17. Until his 20 years he had already written a few novels, like Os Irmãos Ravenas, Zelsica, and Doutores de Engenho, and the novellas O tenente Zé Falcão and O Colar Sangrento.

In 1950 he moved to Rio de Janeiro, where he was able to publish some of his short stories in newspaper and magazines.

He lived for ten years in Brasília, working as professional journalist and public servant.

He founded and published the magazine Sua Revista. Back to Rio de Janeiro, in 1969, he launched in the following year Dimensão Zero, and, in 1977, shortly before his death, published Tonico.

Bibliography 
 Os Irmãos Ravenas, novel
 Zesilca, novel
 Doutores de Engenho, novel
 O Tenente Zé Falcão, novella
 Colar Sangrendo, novella
 Dimensão Zero, novel, 1970
 Tonico, novel, 1977

1929 births
1977 deaths
Brazilian male novelists
20th-century Brazilian novelists
20th-century Brazilian male writers